Armando Félix Ferreira (born 23 December 1919 - deceased 31 July 2005) was a Portuguese footballer who played as a forward.

External links 
 
 

1919 births
2005 deaths
Portuguese footballers
Sportspeople from Barreiro, Portugal
Association football forwards
Primeira Liga players
Sporting CP footballers
Portugal international footballers
Sporting CP managers
Portuguese football managers